Thomas Lincoln Joseph Mullins (12 February 1903 – 2 November 1978) was an American-born Irish Fianna Fáil politician.

Early life
He was born 12 February 1903 in New Rochelle, New York, US, the only child of Martin and Catherine Mullins originally from Cork and Galway respectively. Born on Abraham Lincoln's birthday, he was named after the US president. The family moved to County Cork in 1914, and he was educated at Presentation Brothers School, Kinsale, and St. Enda's School, Rathfarnham. He later graduated with an MA (NUI) and obtained a higher diploma in education.

Fianna Éireann and the IRA
He joined Fianna Éireann and later the Irish Republican Army, serving in A Company, 5th Battalion, Cork No. 3 Brigade. Hw was arrested in 1920 along with his father, and was imprisoned in Spike Island, Wormwood Scrubs, and Ballykinler until the end of 1921. Opposed to the Anglo-Irish Treaty, he joined the anti-Treaty IRA faction and was arrested and imprisoned in Mountjoy, where he went on hunger strike for forty-one days in October 1923.

Politics
A close friend of Éamon de Valera, he was involved in the foundation of Fianna Fáil in 1926, travelling around west Cork along with de Valera to organise forty-five party branches. Mullins was first elected to Dáil Éireann as a Fianna Fáil Teachta Dála (TD) for the Cork West constituency at the June 1927 general election and was re-elected at the September 1927 general election. He did not contest the 1932 general election. He was a member of Cork County Council representing the Bandon electoral area from 1928 to 1934. A journalist, he worked for The Irish Press from 1941 to 1944. 

He was defeated in the Carlow–Kildare constituency at the 1943 and 1944 general elections, and by Seán MacBride at the 1947 Dublin County by-election, he did not seek elected office again, choosing to concentrate on his duties as general secretary of Fianna Fáil, a post he held from 1945 to 1973.

In 1957 he was nominated by the Taoiseach Éamon de Valera to the 9th Seanad. Mullins was re-nominated to the 10th, 11th and 12th Seanad. He served as Leader of the Seanad from 1957 to 1973.

References

1903 births
1978 deaths
Fianna Fáil TDs
Members of the 5th Dáil
Members of the 6th Dáil
Members of the 9th Seanad
Members of the 10th Seanad
Members of the 11th Seanad
Members of the 12th Seanad
Politicians from County Cork
Irish journalists
Nominated members of Seanad Éireann
Fianna Fáil senators
20th-century journalists